Falculina kasyi is a moth in the family Depressariidae. It was described by W. Donald Duckworth in 1966. It is found in Suriname, French Guiana and Amazonas, Brazil.

The wingspan is 26–28 mm. The antenna, head, legs, thorax, forewings and hindwings are identical to those of Falculina ochricostata.

Etymology
The species is named in honor of Dr. Fritz Kasy, lepidopterist at the Natural History Museum, Vienna, Austria.

References

Moths described in 1966
Falculina